Elsa Reichmanis (born 9 December 1953 in Melbourne, Australia) is an American chemist, who was the 2003 president of the American Chemical Society. She was elected a member of the National Academy of Engineering in 1995 for the discovery, development, and engineering leadership of new families of lithographic materials and processes that enable VLSI manufacturing. She was also inducted into the National Academy of Inventors in 2020. She is currently the Anderson Endowed Chair in Chemical and Biomolecular Engineering at Lehigh University. She previously served on the faculty at The Georgia Institute of Technology. Reichmanis is noted for her research into microlithography, and is credited for contributing to the "development of a fundamental molecular level understanding of how chemical structure affects materials function leading to new families of lithographic materials and processes that may enable advanced VLSI manufacturing".

Education
Reichmanis completed her bachelor's degree in chemistry in 1972 and her PhD in organic chemistry in 1975, both at Syracuse University.

Awards and honors 
Reichmanis' awards and honors include:

1992: R&D 100 Award from Research and Development Magazine
1993: Achievement Award from the Society of Women Engineers
1995: Elected a Member of the National Academy of Engineering
1997: Elected Fellow of the American Association for the Advancement of Science
2001: Perkin Medal
2018: Elected a Fellow of the Materials Research Society
2018: ACS Award in the Chemistry of Materials
2020: Elected a Fellow of the National Academy of Inventors

References

American women scientists
21st-century American chemists
Living people
Presidents of the American Chemical Society
1953 births
Members of the United States National Academy of Engineering
Fellows of the American Association for the Advancement of Science
Fellows of the National Academy of Inventors
Georgia Tech faculty
Syracuse University alumni
Scientists at Bell Labs
Scientists from Melbourne
Lehigh University faculty
American women academics
21st-century American women scientists